Terry Martin may refer to:

 Terry Martin (rugby league) (born 1980), Celtic Crusaders rugby league player
 Terry Martin (fighter) (born 1980), mixed martial artist
 Terry Martin (publisher), editor, writer, poet and artist
 Terry Martin (Australian politician) (born 1957), Australian politician
 Terry Martin Sr. (1918–2001), his father, also an Australian politician
 Terry Martin (Alaska politician) (born 1936), American politician in the Alaska House of Representatives
 Terry Martin (ice hockey) (born 1955), professional ice hockey player
 Terry Martin (surfer) (1937–2012), California surfboard shaper
 Terry Martin (actor), see 80,000 Suspects